Taverners Green is a hamlet in the Hatfield Broad Oak civil parish of the Uttlesford district, in the county of Essex, England. Nearby settlements include the villages of Takeley and Hatfield Broad Oak.

Hamlets in Essex
Hatfield Broad Oak